Encyclopaedia Metallum: The Metal Archives (commonly known as Metal Archives per the URL or abbreviated as MA) is an online encyclopedia based upon musical artists who predominantly perform heavy metal music along with its various sub-genres. Encyclopaedia Metallum was described by Matt Sullivan of Nashville Scene as "the Internet's central database for all that is 'tr00' in the metal world." Terrorizer described the site as "a exhaustive list of pretty much every metal band ever, with full discographies, an active forum and an interlinking members list that shows the ever-incestuous beauty of the metal scene". Nevertheless, there are exceptions for bands which fall under disputed genres not accepted by the website.

Encyclopaedia Metallum attempts to provide comprehensive information on each band, such as a discography, logos, pictures, lyrics, line-ups, biography, trivia and user-submitted reviews. The site also provides a system for submitting bands to the archives. The website is free of advertisements and is run completely independently.

History 
The Encyclopaedia Metallum was launched in July 2002 by a Canadian couple from Montreal using the pseudonyms HellBlazer and Morrigan. A couple years prior, HellBlazer had the idea of an encyclopedia for heavy metal and attempted to create an HTML page for every metal band by hand. Although he gave up with that initial attempt, a fully automated site with contributions from its users was in the works. The site initially went live early in July 2002 and the first band (Amorphis) was added on July 7, 2002. In just over a year the site had amassed a database of over 10,000 bands. The site continues to grow at a rate of about 500 bands per month.

On January 1, 2013, the site announced that bands with entirely digital discographies could now be submitted to the Archives, changing the site's decade-long policy of physical releases only. Digital releases must have a fixed track listing, album art, professional or finished production and be available in a high-quality or lossless format through official distribution sources (such as Bandcamp and/or iTunes).

On November 13, 2014, the number of bands listed in the database reached 100,000.

April Fools' Day pranks 
The site has a tradition of April Fool's Day pranks that are sometimes taken seriously. This started in 2009 with the addition of Korn into the Metal Archives, with the news article of the day claiming that the first album was metal enough for the site. Several users left joke reviews praising the band's first self titled album.  A series of staged arguments between moderators appeared throughout the day on the site's forum. Several more April Fool's pranks would follow in later years:

2012- The site posted an FBI logo on the main page suggesting that the site was suspended by the FBI for promoting internet piracy. Despite the ability to bypass this image just by clicking on it, many people took the prank seriously and thought that the Metal-Archives had shut down.

2013- Nickelback were added to the Metal Archives in a prank that was similar to the 2009 Korn prank, as it also had user submitted joke reviews praising various Nickelback albums. Staged arguments between moderators also broke out on the forums.

2014- An influx of reviews of an EP entitled Penis Metal by Chilean black metal band Hades Archer were summitted, mostly praising the album. As of 2022, it is the most reviewed album on the site. There was also a second prank involving the deletion of controversial band Meshuggah whose genre on the site is listed as djent, which are normally not allowed. This led to another series of staged arguments between moderators on the forums. Meshuggah were reinstated the following day.

2015- The website made an announcement introducing a paid premium membership service due to the site growing bigger and requiring more server space and bandwidth, causing it to be more expensive to maintain. For "basic users" without the membership, they are only limited to 15 page views a day, and would have to see advertisements on the site. There membership tiers were announced. "Metal Soldier", "Metal General", and "Metal Dictator".

2016- The site announced it would no longer be moderating user submitted reviews on albums, causing users to believe there would be a huge influx of poorly written reviews.

2017- An announcement was made that Metal Archives would be launching a section dedicated to metal news and commentary and described it as "social media friendly" Various joke articles were written parodying clickbait news websites.

2018- The site announced they were "100% complete" and would no longer be accepting new bands into the archives.

2019- An announcement was made that bands would now be filtered based on their subjective quality.

2020- The site would be dedicating it's servers computational resources to entirely to COVID-19 relief organizations for biomedical research until a cure was found. They stated the site would be taken offline because of this.

2021- The website replaced all of their band photos with cat photos. The prank wound up becoming very popular on the site and abroad with their web traffic more than doubling and led to a launch of a permanent cat version of the site.

2022- The site announced that they would be removing genres in order to simplify and avoid confusion, with them claiming that many bands genres are nearly impossible to pin down. They also mentioned that any user that uses the word "djent" would be banned from the site and forums.

Accepted and excluded bands 

Encyclopaedia Metallum maintains a system where a user with a registered account is free to submit a band to the database that they deem to be within a heavy metal genre, but once the band page gets submitted it goes through an approval process where a moderator (or in some cases, multiple moderators) will review the band's music to determine if it's suitable for the website's classification of metal. Traditional heavy metal genres and era (such as the NWOBHM) have stringent rulings; users are warned in the rules section to consider bands submitted under these classifications as "ambiguous," in the sense that if a band is submitted with these terms as their genre, the music will be extensively reviewed by the moderators before they decide whether or not to accept the band onto the website. This is because in the past, some submissions labeled with those genres have turned out not to be metal, according to the site's guidelines. Bands or artists commonly associated with either hard rock or glam metal will only be accepted if the moderators consider their material to be at least "fully, unambiguously metal", examples being Deep Purple, Def Leppard, Mötley Crüe, Scorpions, Skid Row and Stryper, while the site will not accept certain rock or hard rock-based acts like AC/DC, Guns N' Roses, Kiss, Led Zeppelin or Poison.

Additionally, there are some rare cases of non-metal bands featured on the site that are considered to be part of the metal scene despite not being metal themselves (usually dark ambient and folk bands that are side projects of already well-known established metal artists) examples being Mortiis, Elend, Nest, Of the Wand & the Moon, Autumn Tears, Stille Volk, etc. These bands were selected by the moderators "in an admittedly arbitrary fashion," and their submission by normal users was discouraged. In 2021 the staff collectively decided that they will not be adding any more of these "exception bands" to the database.

Certain genres related to metal that the site does not accept are djent and nu metal, although some bands who are on the site have released albums in the latter genre such as Machine Head and Chimaira; who both released nu metal material in the early 2000s, but are mostly recognized as groove metal bands. Metalcore and deathcore are only allowed on the site if the moderators consider at least one album "clearly more metal than core", examples being Killswitch Engage, As I Lay Dying, After the Burial, Carnifex, All Shall Perish, The Red Chord, and Despised Icon, while other bands such as Bring Me the Horizon, Converge, Atreyu, Born of Osiris, Between the Buried and Me, and Oceano are not allowed on the site.

See also
 Heavy metal subculture
 List of online music databases
 List of online encyclopedias

References

External links
 

Canadian online encyclopedias
Online music and lyrics databases
Heavy metal publications
Internet properties established in 2002
21st-century encyclopedias
Canadian music websites
Lists of practical jokes